The Savonette gas field is a natural gas field located in the Atlantic Ocean. It was discovered in 2004 and developed by BP. It will begin production in 2012 and will produce natural gas and condensates. The total proven reserves of the Savonette gas field are around 2 trillion cubic feet (57×109m³), and production is slated to be around 250 million cubic feet/day (7.14×105m³).

References

Eastern Venezuela Basin
Natural gas fields in Trinidad and Tobago